MLP Team Bergstraße was a German UCI Continental cycling team that existed from 2013 until 2015.

References

Cycling teams based in Germany
Cycling teams established in 2013
Cycling teams disestablished in 2015
UCI Continental Teams (Europe)